WUSW may refer to:

 WMAY-FM, a radio station (92.7 FM) licensed to serve Taylorville, Illinois, United States, which held the call sign WUSW from 2015 to 2021
 WFFX, a radio station (103.7 FM) licensed to serve Hattiesburg, Mississippi, United States, which held the call sign WUSW from 1999 to 2010
 WOZN (AM), a radio station (1670 AM) licensed to serve Madison, Wisconsin, United States, which held the call sign WUSW in 2015
 WWWX, a radio station (96.9 FM) licensed to serve Oshkosh, Wisconsin, United States, which held the call sign WUSW from 1989 to 1999